Mündersbach is an Ortsgemeinde – a community belonging to a Verbandsgemeinde – in the Westerwaldkreis in Rhineland-Palatinate, Germany.

Geography

The community lies between Hachenburg and Herschbach. The residential community of Mündersbach belongs to the Verbandsgemeinde of Hachenburg, a kind of collective municipality. Its seat is in the like-named town.

History
In 1247, Mündersbach had its first documentary mention.

Politics

The municipal council is made up of 13 council members, including the extraofficial mayor (Bürgermeister), who were elected in a majority vote in a municipal election on 13 June 2004.

Economy and infrastructure

Transport
The community lies directly on Bundesstraße 413 from Bendorf to Hachenburg. The nearest Autobahn interchanges are in Dierdorf, Neuwied and Ransbach-Baumbach on the A 3 (Cologne–Frankfurt), each some 15 km away. The nearest InterCityExpress stop is the railway station at Montabaur on the Cologne-Frankfurt high-speed rail line. Trains reach both cities in 30 to 40 minutes.

Public institutions
The community has at its disposal a floodlit sporting ground and a tennis court with three places. The village's children can enjoy themselves at public playing fields and playgrounds. There is also a community house (multipurpose hall) in Mündersbach with a modern kindergarten as well as a community bakehouse with a long baking tradition.

References

External links
Mündersbach in the collective municipality’s Web pages 

Municipalities in Rhineland-Palatinate
Westerwaldkreis